Before Ever After is the fourth studio album by Blind Idiot God, released by Indivisible Records on February 24, 2015. It marks the first album of new studio material by the band since Cyclotron, released twenty-two years prior. Produced by guitarist Andy Hawkins with composer Bill Laswell, the album was first issued on double LP, then on CD and finally as a digital download. Laswell has described Before Ever After as the band's apex.

Background
When drummer Ted Epstein left the band in 1996, guitarist Andy Hawkins and Gabriel Katz placed Blind Idiot God on indefinite hiatus while they searched for his replacement. Tim Wyskida, formerly of Khanate, joined them on drums in 2001 and Blind Idiot God began recording new material, with more emphasis placed on improvisation. In 2006 the band returned to the stage and performed a series of shows around New York City. Gabriel Katz, who had previously delayed band activities after developing tendinitis and hearing problems, finally left the band and was replaced by Will Dahl in 2012.

News of Before Ever Afters release was first announced through the band's Facebook page on June 4, 2014. The album comprises music composed over a ten year period from when the band first reunited in 2001. In 2013, three tracks recorded for the album titled "Barrage", "Shutdown" and "High and Mighty" appeared in the HBO documentary Downloaded, a film by Alex Winter examining the history of Napster. A new piece titled "Voice of the Structure", a solo recording by Andy Hawkins, was released on August 6 on Azonic's Bandcamp website and is set to appear on the album.

The artwork for Before Ever After was created by Seldon Hunt, known for his work with Earth, Neurosis, and the Melvins.

Track listing

Personnel
Adapted from the Before Ever After liner notes.Blind Idiot GodAndy Hawkins – electric guitar, 7-string guitar, production, mixing
Gabriel Katz – 5-string fretted bass, 5-string fretless bass
Tim Wyskida – drumsProduction and design'
Jason Corsaro – engineering
James Dellatacoma – engineering, mixing
Alex DeTurk – mastering
Michael Fossenkemper – mastering
Seldon Hunt – illustrations, design
Bill Laswell – production, mixing
Robert Musso – engineering

Release history

References

External links 
Before Ever After at Bandcamp
 

2015 albums
Blind Idiot God albums
Albums produced by Andy Hawkins (musician)
Albums produced by Bill Laswell